Bernabe Lovina (11 June 1921 – 15 April 1985) was a Filipino sprinter. He competed in the men's 100 metres at the 1948 Summer Olympics.

References

External links
 

1921 births
1985 deaths
Sportspeople from Pangasinan
Athletes (track and field) at the 1948 Summer Olympics
Filipino male sprinters
Olympic track and field athletes of the Philippines
Place of birth missing
Asian Games medalists in athletics (track and field)
Asian Games bronze medalists for the Philippines
Athletes (track and field) at the 1951 Asian Games
Medalists at the 1951 Asian Games